Xylophanes kaempferi is a moth of the  family Sphingidae. It is known from Paraguay.

It is very similar to Xylophanes elara, but the forewing apex is less falcate and the dark scaling of the submarginal band on the hindwing upperside is lacking. Thus making the band entirely green.

Adults are probably on wing year-round.

The larvae possibly feed on Psychotria panamensis, Psychotria nervosa and Pavonia guanacastensis.

References

kaempferi
Moths described in 1931
Endemic fauna of Paraguay
Moths of South America